The Lock Up may refer to:

The Lock Up (company), an American self-storage firm
The Lock Up (TV series), a BBC television programme

See also
Lock up (disambiguation)